Ashanti to Zulu: African Traditions is a 1976 children's book written by Margaret Musgrove and illustrated by Leo and Diane Dillon. It was Musgrove's first book, but the Dillons were experienced artists and this book won them the second of their two consecutive Caldecott Medals. (The first was for Why Mosquitoes Buzz in People's Ears: A West African Tale.)

The book features twenty-six illustrations of native African peoples, each accompanied by a short vignette describing one of the customs of that particular people.

Peoples included in the book:

Ashanti
Baule
Chagga
Dogon
Ewe
Fanti
Ga
Hausa
Ikoma
Jie
Kung
Lozi
Masai
Ndaka
Ouadai
Pondo
Quimbande
Rendille
Sotho
Tuareg
Uge
Vai
Wagenia
Xhosa
Yoruba
Zulu

References

1976 children's books
Caldecott Medal–winning works
Books with cover art by Leo and Diane Dillon
Books about Africa
Books illustrated by Leo and Diane Dillon
African culture
American picture books